St. Mark's Episcopal Church and variations may refer to:

 St. Mark's Episcopal Church (Hope, Arkansas)
 St. Mark's Episcopal Church (Glendale, California)
 St. Mark's Episcopal Church (Berkeley, California)
 St. Mark's Episcopal Church (Washington, D.C.)
 St. Mark's Episcopal Church (Cocoa, Florida)
 St. Mark's Episcopal Church (Haines City, Florida)
 St. Mark's Episcopal Church (Palatka, Florida)
 St. Mark's Episcopal Church (Starke, Florida)
 St. Mark's Episcopal Church (Louisville, Kentucky)
 St. Mark's Episcopal Church (Shreveport, Louisiana)
 St. Mark's Episcopal Church (Augusta, Maine)
 St. Mark's Episcopal Church (Highland, Maryland)
 St. Mark's Episcopal Church (Kingston, Maryland)
 St. Mark's Episcopal Church (Lappans, Maryland)
 St. Mark's Episcopal Church (Perryville, Maryland)
 St. Mark's Episcopal Church (Boston, Massachusetts)
 St. Mark's Episcopal Church (Worcester, Massachusetts)
 St. Mark's Episcopal Cathedral (Minneapolis), Minnesota
St. Mark's Episcopal Chapel (Corinna Township, Minnesota)
 Saint Mark's Episcopal Church (Raymond, Mississippi)
 St. Mark's Pro-Cathedral (Hastings, Nebraska)
 St. Mark's Episcopal Church (Tonopah, Nevada)
 St. Mark's Episcopal Church (Ashland, New Hampshire)
 St. Mark's Episcopal Church (West Orange, New Jersey)
 Saint Mark's Episcopal Church (Chelsea, New York)
 St. Mark's Episcopal Church (Fort Montgomery, New York)
 St. Mark's Episcopal Church (Green Island, New York)
 St. Mark's Episcopal Church (Hoosick Falls, New York)
 St. Mark's Episcopal Church (Mt. Kisco, New York)
 Saint Mark's and Saint John's Episcopal Church, Rochester, New York
 St. Mark's Episcopal Church (Halifax, North Carolina)
 St. Mark's Episcopal Church (Huntersville, North Carolina)
 St. Mark's Episcopal Church (Wadsworth, Ohio)
 St. Mark's Episcopal Church (Jim Thorpe, Pennsylvania)
 St. Mark's Episcopal Church (Philadelphia)
 St. Mark's Episcopal Church (Pinewood, South Carolina)
 St. Mark's Episcopal Church (San Antonio, Texas)
 St. Mark's Cathedral (Salt Lake City)
 St. Mark's Episcopal Church (Alexandria, Virginia)
 St. Mark's Episcopal Cathedral, Seattle
 St. Mark's Episcopal Church (St. Albans, West Virginia)
 St. Mark's Episcopal Church (Beaver Dam, Wisconsin)
 St. Mark's Episcopal Church, Guild Hall and Vicarage, Oconto, Wisconsin
 St. Mark's Episcopal Church (Cheyenne, Wyoming)

See also
 St. Mark's Episcopal Cathedral (disambiguation)
 St. Mark's Church (disambiguation)